Fighters for Freedom. Lithuanian Partisans Versus the U.S.S.R. is an autobiographical account of the struggles of the anti-Soviet Lithuanian partisans written by Juozas Lukša (nom de guerre Daumantas), one of the leaders of the partisans. The book became one of the most important and well known accounts of Soviet crimes against the humanity in Lithuania and of the life of the partisans. The book was first published in Lithuanian in 1950 and has been translated to English, Swedish, German, and Ukrainian. The original Lithuanian book has been reprinted six times.

The book was written by Lukša under original title Partizanai už geležinės uždangos (Partisans Behind the Iron Curtain) during his stay  in Paris in 1948–1950. It is based on memories of Lukša and documents of the Lithuanian partisans and describes the first three years of the Soviet occupation (1944–1947). Lukša describes hard life of the partisans, the Soviet terror on Lithuanian people, and the crossing the Iron Curtain at the end of 1947 to the West. He along with fellow partisans Jurgis Krikščiūnas–Rimvydas and Kazimieras Pyplys–Mažytis crossed through the Iron Curtain as messengers to the West in hopes to attract support for the fighters and to establish contacts with Lithuanians in exile. They carried information collected by partisans about Soviet repressions, killings and deportations, also a letter to Pope Pius XII explaining the situation in occupied Lithuania and asking for support for struggling nation. Lukša returned to Lithuania – he was parachuted to Lithuanian forests in 1950. For a year he was intensively searched for by the Soviet counterintelligence. Finally he was betrayed by fellow fighter Jonas Kukauskas and killed in fall 1951.

Editions
English
 
 
 

Lithuanian

Other

References

1950 books
Lithuanian books
Lithuanian partisans